Norman Hollis Robinson (born 1951 in Toomsuba, Lauderdale County, Mississippi) is a former journalist in New Orleans, where he served as reporter for WVUE-TV from 1976 to 1978 and WWL-TV from February 1979 through July 1989, and later news anchor for WDSU-TV Channel 6 (NBC), where he worked in the news department from July 1990 until his retirement in May 2014.

Career
After service as a musician in the United States Marine Corps, he began his career in broadcast journalism on radio in Southern California and then worked successively in television in Mobile, Alabama and New Orleans prior to being awarded a Nieman Fellowship to Harvard University. After completing the Nieman Fellowship he joined CBS Network News in New York, and the District of Columbia (where he served on the White House Press Corps for CBS) before moving back to New Orleans. Robinson is known for his tough straight forward interviewing skills. It was on the news program which Robinson anchors that New Orleans City Councilwoman Stacy Head was interviewed as she started posting her e-mails online during the height of the 2009 New Orleans e-mail controversy.

1991 Louisiana gubernatorial debate
Robinson received significant national and international attention in 1991 when he questioned Louisiana gubernatorial candidate David Duke, a Republican State Representative and former Grand Wizard of the Knights of the Ku Klux Klan, during the state's runoff debate. Robinson, who is African-American, told Duke that he was "scared" at the prospect of Duke winning the election because of his history of "diabolical, evil, vile" racist and anti-Semitic comments, some of which he read to Duke. He then pressed Duke for an apology and when Duke protested that Robinson was not being fair to him, Robinson replied that he didn't think Duke was being honest. Jason Berry of the Los Angeles Times called it "startling TV" and the "catalyst" for the "overwhelming" turnout of black voters that helped former Governor Edwin Edwards defeat Duke.

Post Katrina
In June 2008 Robinson was furloughed by WDSU after being arrested for driving while intoxicated but returned to work a month later. Robinson promised that he would never again drive while under the influence of alcohol. In an April 2009 testimony concerning the role of the United States Army Corps of Engineers in the Mississippi River Gulf Outlet, Robinson said that post-Katrina trauma, including loss of his home:
I ended up going to a psychologist because I wanted to commit suicide, and I ended up in a drunken stupor most of the time.

Personal life
He is a member of Golden Key International Honour Society and a deacon at  Central St. Matthew United Church of Christ in New Orleans.

References

External links
  (National Aeronautics and Space Administration)

1951 births
Living people
African-American journalists
Our Lady of Holy Cross College alumni
People from Gaithersburg, Maryland
People from Lauderdale County, Mississippi
Television anchors from New Orleans
United States Marines
African-American television personalities
Journalists from Alabama
Journalists from Mississippi
Nieman Fellows
Military personnel from Mobile, Alabama
Military personnel from Mississippi
21st-century African-American people
20th-century African-American people